See also Kaiser.

Kaisers is a municipality in the district of Reutte in the Austrian state of Tyrol.

Geography
Kaisers lies in a side valley of the Lech.

References

External links

Cities and towns in Reutte District